Storthocalyx is a genus of shrubs and trees in the family Sapindaceae.  The genus is  endemic to New Caledonia in the Pacific and contains five species. It is related to Gongrodiscus and Sarcotoechia.

List of species
 Storthocalyx chryseus
 Storthocalyx corymbosus
 Storthocalyx leioneurus
 Storthocalyx pancheri
 Storthocalyx sordidus

References

Endemic flora of New Caledonia
Sapindaceae
Sapindaceae genera